Venuti is a surname. Notable people with the surname include:

Joe Venuti (1903–1978), American jazz musician
Lawrence Venuti (born 1953), American translator
 Lorenzo Venuti, Italian footballer
Maria Venuti, Australian actor and singer
Mario Venuti, Italian singer-songwriter